Eda IF  is a sports club in Eda, Sweden, established in November 1941 as a ski jumping and soccer club.

The women's soccer team, which was started in 1974, played in the Swedish top division in 1982.

In 2007, the club began to play floorball.

References

External links
Soccer 
Floorball 

1941 establishments in Sweden
Football clubs in Värmland County
Sports clubs established in 1941
Swedish floorball teams
Ski clubs in Sweden